Ethyl propionate is an organic compound with formula C2H5O2CCH2CH3. It is the ethyl ester of propionic acid. It is a colorless volatile liquid with a pineapple-like odor. Some fruits such as kiwis and strawberries contain ethyl propionate in small amounts.

Uses and reactions
It is also used in the production of some antimalarial drugs including pyrimethamine.

Ethyl propionate can be synthesized by the Fischer esterification of ethanol and propionic acid:
CH3CH2OH  +  CH3CH2CO2H   →   CH3CH2O2CCH2CH3   +   H2O

It participates in condensation reactions by virtue of the weakly acidic methylene group.

See also
Methyl propionate, a similar compound

References

Propionate esters
Ethyl esters
Flavors